Lakewood is a city in Cuyahoga County, Ohio, United States, on the southern shore of Lake Erie.  Established in 1889, it is one of Cleveland's historical streetcar suburbs and part of the Cleveland metropolitan area. The population was 50,942 at the 2020 census, making it the third largest city in Cuyahoga County, behind Cleveland and Parma.

History

Lakewood was incorporated as a village in 1889, and named for its lakefront location.

Earliest days
The wilderness west of the Cuyahoga River was delayed being settled due to a treaty the American government made with the Native Americans in 1785, whereby no white man was to settle on that land. Consequently, when Moses Cleaveland arrived in 1796, his activities were confined to the east side of the river.

The area now called Lakewood was populated by the Ottawa, Potawatomi, Chippewa, Wyandot, Munsee, Delaware and Shawnee tribes until the Treaty of Ft. Industry pushed them west in 1805. The treaty, signed at Ft. Industry near what is now downtown Toledo, Ohio, ceded 500,000 acres of some of the tribes' land to the United States for about $18,000 or 3.5 cents/acre. The Shawnee and Seneca, living with the Wyandot, were to get $1000 "...every year forever hereafter."

The area now occupied by Lakewood, Rocky River, Fairview Park, and West Park was purchased from the Connecticut Land Company by a syndicate of six men headed by Judson Canfield on April 4, 1807, for $26,084.

In 1806 the area was formally surveyed as Rockport Township. In 1818, permanent settlement began with the arrival from Connecticut of James Nicholson. Other early pioneers included Jared Kirtland and Mars Wager. Settlements were mostly along Detroit Avenue, a toll road operated by the Rockport Plank Company from 1848 to 1901, with large farms and properties extending north to Lake Erie. Making bricks and planting orchards were among the most prolific occupations until natural gas and oil wells were developed in the early 1880s.

By 1819 18 families lived in Rockport Township. In 1893, streetcars came to Lakewood with the construction of the Detroit Avenue line, followed by the Clifton Boulevard line in 1903 and the Madison Avenue line in 1916.

First government
Lakewood, the first suburb west of Cleveland on the shores of Lake Erie, began as Township 7, Range 14, of the Connecticut Western Reserve in 1805. It was a wooded wilderness through which cut the old Huron Post Road that ran from Buffalo, New York, to Detroit, Michigan. In 1819 a small group of eighteen families living in the area of present-day Lakewood, Rocky River, and part of Cleveland's West Park neighborhood named the growing community Rockport Township. In April of that year, the first election took place in Rufus Wright's tavern with a member of each household present. Three were elected as trustees: Henry Alger, Erastus Johnson, and Rufus Wright. Elected as overseers of the poor were James Nicholson and Samuel Dean. Henry Canfield was elected clerk. This type of government served Rockport for the next 70 years, with an election held each year.

In 1889 East Rockport, with 400 residents, separated from the township and became the Hamlet of Lakewood. Settlement accelerated rapidly, with Lakewood becoming a village with 3,500 residents in 1903. City status, with 12,000 residents, came just eight years later. By 1930 the population of Lakewood was 70,509.

Agriculture
The early settlers in Township 7 sustained their lives through farming. The land was ideal for fruit farming and many vineyards began to emerge. Current street names reflect this history such as Orchard Grove and Blossom Park. The fertile soil and lake climate that were ideal for producing crops is what attracted many people to move to the township. There was also vast amounts of trees to be used for building homes and other structures. The most common occupations in Lakewood were farming and the building trades.

First roads
Roads were the earliest influence on development in Lakewood. The Rockport Plank Road Company improved the old Detroit Road in 1848, opening a toll road from present-day West 25th Street in Cleveland to five miles west of the Rocky River. It continued operating as a toll road until 1901. A series of bridges spanning the Rocky River Valley, the first of which was built in 1821, improved commerce between Cleveland and the emerging communities to its west. An 1874 atlas of Cuyahoga County shows present-day main roads such as Detroit Avenue, Madison Avenue, Franklin Boulevard, Hilliard Road, Warren Road, and Riverside Drive.

Schools

Under the Ohio Common School Act of April 9, 1867, three schools were allotted to East Rockport, called 6, 8, and 10; they were later designated East, Middle, and West. Each school had one teacher. As the community began to grow and more schools were required, the school board adopted the policy of honoring Ohio's presidents by assigning their names to the school buildings.

Railroads

The Rocky River Railroad was organized in 1869 by speculators as an excursion line to bring Clevelanders to the resort area they developed at the mouth of the Rocky River. Financially unsuccessful as a pleasure and amusement venture, the line was sold to the Nickel Plate Railroad in 1881. The railroad line still exists today, running in an east–west direction north of Detroit Avenue.

Lakewood Hospital

Lakewood Hospital first opened its doors in 1907. The hospital, founded by Dr. Lee Graber, was originally located in a double house on Detroit Avenue, then built a "modern" building in 1917 and was renovated in 1940, 1950, 1967 and 1970-71. The city of Lakewood purchased the hospital in 1931. The Cleveland Clinic added the hospital to its health system in 2006.

In January 2015, the Cleveland Clinic announced it would close the hospital in 2016 and replace it with a family medical center. After a year of community debate, the hospital was closed. The new medical center which included outpatient programs, an emergency department and wellness services opened across the street from the old hospital site in 2018. None of the 845 employees of Lakewood lost their jobs, as they were offered other positions in the Cleveland Clinic system. There was opposition to the closing from a citizens' group called "Save Lakewood Hospital" who contended that the city could find another entity to manage the hospital and keep it open.

Geography

The city borders Lake Erie to the north, the Cleveland neighborhoods of Edgewater and Cudell to the east, and the neighborhoods of Jefferson and Kamm's Corners to the south. It borders the suburb of Rocky River to the west at the Rocky River valley.

Neighborhoods
 Arts District - Centered around the Beck Center for the Arts, on the west side of Lakewood.
 Birdtown - Southeastern corner of Lakewood, a well-known 8-street residential district on the southeast side of the city that was built specifically for the workers of the nearby National Carbon Company in the 1890s. The houses are distinctive and most of the streets are named after birds. Birdtown was designated a National Register Historic District in 2006. It is adjacent to Madison Park, the former Union Carbide factory, and the W. 117th St. Rapid Transit Station. Many of the original houses built there were boarding houses. Birdtown achieved National Historic Register status in 2006.
 Clifton Boulevard - Lined with big trees and multi-family homes, apartment complexes, and 4×4 brick structures, and turn of the century single family colonials, the seven-lane Clifton Boulevard is one of the busiest streets in greater Cleveland.
 Clifton Park - The wealthiest neighborhood of Lakewood is situated in the northwestern corner of the city, and consists mostly of magnificent Victorian mansions. It is bounded by Sloane on the south, West Clifton on the east, The Rocky River on the west, and Lake Erie on the north. Built in the late 19th century, this area has been historically, and continues to be, home to many of greater Cleveland's most prominent citizens. Includes the private Clifton Beach community.
 Downtown Lakewood - The main section of Lakewood is centered at Detroit Avenue and Warren Road.  Downtown Lakewood spans from Bunts Avenue to the east and Arthur Avenue to the west along Detroit. This district was formally identified when Lakewood was chosen as a member of the national MainStreet program in 2005. The area is lined with office buildings, restaurants, and variety shops. Lakewood Library, the USPS, and the site of the former Lakewood Hospital are all located in this district.
 The Edge - This easternmost neighborhood includes many concert venues, pubs, and taverns.
Victorian Village - This was named after the large Victorian homes on Grace, Clarence and Cohassett Avenues on the city's east end. When constructed in the early 1900s, it served as residences for executives from the National Carbon Company.
 The Gold Coast - Collection of high rises on the northeast end of Lakewood, bordering Lake Erie.
 Rockport Square - Rockport Square (not to be confused with the former Rockport Township) is an urban renewal project along Detroit Avenue on the eastern side of the city. Construction began in 2004 of roughly 200 condos, lofts, and live-work spaces.
 West End - The West End is the westernmost neighborhood of Lakewood, along the Rocky River Reservation. In 2002, the administration of Mayor Madelaine Cain proposed to seize homes in this area using eminent domain, to replace them with retail development. After a citizen-led resistance attracted national media attention from 60 Minutes, the West End proposal failed in a 2003 referendum.

Demographics

As of the census of 2010, there were 52,131 people, 25,274 households, and 11,207 families residing in the city. The racial makeup of the city was 87.5% White, 6.4% African American, 0.3% Native American, 1.9% Asian, 1.3% from other races, and 2.7% from two or more races. Hispanic or Latino of any race were 4.1% of the population.

There were 25,274 households, of which 22.5% had children under the age of 18 living with them, 29.7% were married couples living together, 10.8% had a female householder with no husband present, 3.8% had a male householder with no wife present, and 55.7% were non-families. 44.8% of all households were made up of individuals, and 9.8% had someone living alone who was 65 years of age or older. The average household size was 2.05 and the average family size was 2.99.

The median age in the city was 35.4 years. 19.6% of residents were under the age of 18; 9.6% were between the ages of 18 and 24; 34.3% were from 25 to 44; 25.7% were from 45 to 64; and 11% were 65 years of age or older. The gender makeup of the city was 49.1% male and 50.9% female.

As of the 2007 American Community Survey, the median income for a household in the city was $42,602, and the median income for a family was $59,201. Males had a median income of $42,599 versus $35,497 for females. The per capita income for the city was $26,939. About 10.9% of families and 14.3% of the population were below the poverty line, including 20.3% of those under age 18 and 10.5% of those age 65 or over. Of the city's population over the age of 25, 39.0% hold a bachelor's degree or higher.

According to the 2020 United States census, Lakewood had a population of 50,942. Of which, 82.7% were non-hispanic White, 5.2% were non-hispanic Black, 4.8% were Hispanic/Latino, 2.4% were Asian, 5.9% were mixed or other.

Ethnicity and immigration
Lakewood's ethnic mosaic includes Albanian, Arab, Chinese, German, Hungarian, Irish, Italian, Mexican, Nepalese, Puerto Rican, Polish, Russian, Slovak, and Ukrainian ancestries. As of 2019, 12.2% spoke a language other than English at home, including Arabic, Spanish, Albanian, Russian, Serbo-Croatian, and Hungarian. The community is a hotspot for immigrants, arriving primarily from Southeast Europe (especially Albania, Romania, Greece, and the former Yugoslavia), the Middle East (Lebanon, Syria, and Iran), South Asia (India, Nepal, and Myanmar), and the former USSR (Russia, Uzbekistan, and Ukraine). The foreign-born population was approximately 8.6% in 2019.

Economy

Development

 The Lakewood Library's 2008 expansion (its first in over 20 years) increased the main library to 93,000 square feet; the collection then grew to over 474,000 items by 2015. The Lakewood Library also celebrated its centennial in 2016. The Madison branch of the Library, designed by architectural firm Walter and Weeks, opened in 1929 in the southeastern part of the city. It underwent a $2.1 million renovation and expansion, and reopened to the public in March 2022.
 Rockport Square was developed on the eastern end of the city in 2004 and incorporated residential townhouses all along Detroit Avenue.
 The Cleveland Clinic completed construction of a new one-story facility on Detroit Avenue in 2005, adjacent to Rockport Square.
 The Lakewood YMCA finished construction of its new facility on Detroit Avenue in 2004. The two-story gymnasium features state-of-the-art exercise equipment, an indoor swimming pool, yoga lessons, and an extended babysitting service. 
 The Cleveland Clinic began demolition in 2016 of a professional office building and garage in preparation for the construction of a new $34 million, 62,000 square foot family health building, which will serve as a replacement, in part, for Lakewood Hospital. The hospital's emergency department remains open through the construction, which is scheduled to be completed in 2018. 
 The highways that go through Lakewood are U.S. Route 20, U.S. Route 6 Alternate, and Ohio State Route 237. In the south of the city, Interstate 90 enters the city limits.

Awards
 In 2009, the American Institute of Architects and the Cleveland Restoration Society honored the City of Lakewood Department of Planning & Development and LakewoodAlive with an award for Creative & Effective Preservation Advocacy in 2009.
 The City of Lakewood was accepted into the nationally renowned Ohio Main Street Program in 2005.

Arts and culture

Attractions
 Lakewood Park is one of the largest lakefront parks in Ohio and features a live concert stage, outdoor swimming pool, picnic pavilions, 4-season public pavilion, kids' playground, baseball, volleyball, and a skate park, which opened in 2004. The park's million dollar lakefront promenade opened in 2006 and offers an excellent panorama of Downtown Cleveland and the presence of viewing telescopes enhances the viewing experience of Downtown Cleveland. An all-purpose trail that circles the park was built in 2006.
On October 30, 2015, Lakewood opened its "Solstice Steps" in the northwest corner of the park. The steps are aligned in the direction of sunset on the summer solstice.  They are constructed of white concrete blocks in five tiers; each tier has four steps separated by green grass strips.
A renovated Charles A. Foster Pool is expected to open for the 2023 outdoor swimming season.
The Rocky River Reservation of the Cleveland Metroparks System forms part of the city's western border. The Lakewood Dog Park, built in 2004, is located next to the Metroparks, in the Rocky River valley.
 Lakewood Public Library has won numerous awards and has two branches: the main branch on Detroit Avenue and a smaller branch on Madison Avenue. The Lakewood Library is normally ranked one of the top 5 libraries in the US for its size on a regular basis, and was awarded "Best Place to Hang Out if You're Broke" by Scene Magazine in 2009.
 The Lakewood Civic Auditorium, a 2,000-seat performing arts venue located on the campus of Lakewood High School, opened in 1955. The auditorium hosted the Great Lakes Shakespeare Festival from 1962 to 1981. The facade of the auditorium features the world's largest free-standing ceramic sculpture, Early Settler, created by Viktor Schreckengost. The sculpture is commonly known as "Johnny Appleseed" who was the subject of Schreckengost's design.
 The Beck Center for the Arts is the largest cultural arts center on Cleveland's west shore.
 Geiger's, a retailer of clothing and ski equipment and accessories, was founded in downtown Lakewood in 1932. The company, now run by the third generation of the Geiger family, moved to its present location in 1936.
 The home of Malley's Chocolates is in Lakewood.
 Aladdin's Eatery, a national restaurant brand, is based in Lakewood. Their first restaurant was founded in Lakewood by Fady and Sally Chamoun in 1994. Aladdin's Lakewood Headquarters was expanded in 2007.

Government
Lakewood is governed by an elected mayor and elected council. The council has seven members, with four members representing wards in the city and the other three are at-large council members. Once politically dominated by New England Republicans, Lakewood has become a center for the progressive wing of the Democratic Party in Ohio. It was a stronghold of support for former Congressman Dennis Kucinich, and in the 2016 Democratic presidential primary, its voters strongly backed Bernie Sanders. The city is currently represented in the U.S. House of Representatives by Shontel Brown (OH-11, D). In the Ohio General Assembly it is represented by Nickie Antonio (D) in the State Senate and by Michael Skindell in the (D) State House.

Notable former mayors include Anthony Sinagra (19781990), Madeline Cain (19962003), and Ed FitzGerald (20082010).

Education

Public schools

The City of Lakewood Public School System is managed by a directly elected school board. The Lakewood City Schools was rated as having "Continuous Improvement" by the Ohio Department of Education in 2013. Lakewood rebuilt or renovated the city's high school, two middle schools and seven elementary schools in a process completed in 2017. The investment was the first major school building program in Lakewood since 1920. The school system is one of the largest employers in the city of Lakewood.

 Lakewood High School 
 Franklin Elementary, Franklin Boulevard - opened in 1909, closed in June 2009
 Grant Elementary, 1470 Victoria Avenue
 Emerson Elementary, 13439 Clifton Boulevard
 Harrison Elementary, 2080 Quail Street 
 Hayes Elementary, 16401 Delaware Avenue
 Lincoln Elementary,  15615 Clifton Boulevard
 Horace Mann Elementary, 1215 West Clifton Boulevard
 Roosevelt Elementary, 14327 Athens Avenue
 Harding Middle School - a new building replaced the original facility in 2007
 Garfield Middle School - a new middle school building that was formerly an elementary school, re-opened in 2007; efforts were made to retain the original facade of the school, which was constructed in the late 1800s
 Taft Elementary - closed June 2008; now the home of the Lakewood City Schools administrative offices.

Private schools
 Lakewood Catholic Academy, K-8, founded in 2005 through a consolidation of four parochial elementary schools, St. James, St. Luke and St. Clements and Transfiguration on the site of the former St. Augustine Academy. Since its founding, over $1.5 million has been invested in capital improvements, making LCA a "significant institution for parochial education in Lakewood. 
 Lakewood Lutheran School - K-8 integrated elementary education
 Padre Pio Academy - a K-12 elementary/high school founded by lay Catholics striving to be loyal to the Magisterium of the Church;  offers a classical curriculum; member of NAPCIS, the National Association of Private Catholic and Independent Schools
 St. Edward High School - private Roman Catholic High School for boys which attracts students from around northeastern Ohio; new athletic facilities and chapel constructed in 2004 and 2006; they were Ohio Division I football champions in 2010, 2014, 2015, 2018, 2021, 2022
 The Virginia Marti College of Design - offers degrees in Digital Media, Fashion Design, Fashion Merchandising, Graphic Design and Interior Design
 The University of Akron holds evening classes at Lakewood High School

Infrastructure

Transportation 
 The Greater Cleveland Regional Transit Authority's Cleveland State Line (routes 55,55B,55C), run east and west along Clifton Boulevard, terminating at Cleveland State University in downtown Cleveland to the east and in North Olmstead (55) or Bay Village (55B) and Westlake (55C) to the west.
 RTA Routes 26 and 26A serve Detroit Avenue, Route 83 serves Warren Road, Route 78 serves as the border line on West 117th Street, and Route 25 serves Madison Avenue.
 Two RTA rapid transit stations exist just across the Lakewood/Cleveland border, at W. 117th St. and Madison Avenue and the other between Lakewood Heights and Triskett near West 140.  Both stations provide access to the Red Line east to Windermere via Downtown Cleveland and west to Cleveland Hopkins International Airport. 
 RTA's Route 804, the Lakewood Community Circulator, was discontinued by RTA in late 2009. Lakewood residents and city officials were campaigning for it to return.
 I-90 borders the south side of Lakewood and has on/off-ramps at W. 117th St., Bunts Road, Warren Road, and McKinley Road.
 Lakewood is bicycle-friendly, with designated "share the road" paths through the city.

Notable people

Birthplace
 Richard Celeste, Governor of Ohio from 1983 to 1990, director of the Peace Corps, and 12th president of Colorado College
 Teri Garr, actress/singer/comedian
 Brian Hoyer, New England Patriots quarterback
 John L. Koprowski, university dean and professor
 Dave Malloy, three-time Tony Award nominee
 Seán Patrick O'Malley, Roman Catholic Cardinal and Archbishop of Boston
 Benjamin Orr, singer and bassist for The Cars

Former/current residents
 David Conte, composer
Mike Douglas, singer and talk show host
 Mike Hegan, professional baseball player and broadcaster for the Cleveland Indians
 Gary Lewis, musician 
 John Lithgow, actor
 Kevin McMahon, musician
 Burgess Meredith, actor
 Lorin Morgan-Richards, author and illustrator
Darlington Nagbe, professional soccer player
 Jack Riley, actor

Other notes 
 The City of Lakewood first introduced curbside recycling in 1989 and has one of the highest recycling rates in all of Ohio: 79% in 2009.
 A handful of print and online media chronicle Lakewood, including LakewoodBuzz.com, a Lakewood channel of Patch.com, The Sun Post-Herald, and The Lakewood Observer.
 Lakewood operates a CERT program. This all-citizen emergency response program was created in 2005.
 According to the Free Times and The Plain Dealer, Lakewood has the highest concentration of vegetarians and vegans in northeast Ohio.
 Historical housing throughout the city and an active historical society are the norm in Lakewood. The "Make Lakewood Beautiful" program involves contests in which residents compete to make their homes look and resemble their original design and architecture, and awards are given to several homeowners each year. The city offers tours of the most famous homes in the spring, summer, and fall.

Notes

Further reading

External links

 

 
Cities in Ohio
Cities in Cuyahoga County, Ohio
Ohio populated places on Lake Erie